Mayflies is a two-part British television drama starring Martin Compston and Tony Curran, adapted by Andrea Gibb from Andrew O'Hagan's 2020 novel of the same name, and directed by Peter Mackie Burns.

Synopsis
Tully and Jimmy have been friends since 1986 after meeting in Scotland. Thirty years later, Jimmy received a heartbreaking phone call from Tully that he has terminal cancer.

Cast
  Martin Compston as Jimmy 
 Rian Gordon as Young Jimmy
 Tony Curran as Tully
 Tom Glynn-Carney as Young Tully
 Ashley Jensen as Anna
 Tracy Ifeachor as Iona
 Paul Gorman as Young Hogg
 Matt Littleson as Limbo
 Cal MacAninch - Tibbs
 Mitchell Robertson as Young Tibbs
 Elaine C Smith - Barbara
 Charlene Boyd as young Barbara
 Shauna Macdonald - Fiona
 Colin McCredie - Scott

Production
The BBC announced the project in August 2022. Set and filmed in Scotland, Synchronicity Films were announced to be producing for the BBC. Compston described the process of adapting an acclaimed novel “terrifying” while Curran said they had tried to “honour” the book.

Broadcast
The first episode of Mayflies aired in the UK on BBC One on Wednesday, December 28 at 9pm, the second episode the following day at the same time.

Reception
The Financial Times reviewed a “thoughtful exploration of how death liberates the soon-to-be deceased, and devastates those left behind” with an “array of stirring performances”. The Guardian described it as “beautifully told” whilst “Curran is deeply moving as a man who refuses to let death have the last laugh, with Ashley Jensen as his firecracker wife Anna.”

References

External links

Television shows set in Scotland
Television shows filmed in Scotland
Television shows filmed in the United Kingdom
2022 British television series debuts
2022 British television series endings
2020s British drama television series
2020s British television miniseries
BBC television dramas
English-language television shows